A valve guide  is a cylindrical piece of metal, pressed or integrally cast into the cylinder head of most types of reciprocating engines, to positively locate a poppet valve so that it may make proper contact with its valve seat.  Along with a corresponding valve spring, it is one of the components of any engine’s valve train. 
  
Guides also serve to conduct heat from the combustion process out from the exhaust valve and into the cylinder head where it may be taken up by the cooling system. Bronze is commonly used, as is steel; a balance between stiffness and wear on the valve is essential to achieve a useful service life.

The clearance between the inner diameter of the valve guide and the outer diameter of the poppet valve stem is critical for the proper performance of an engine. If there is too little clearance, the valve may stick as oil contaminants and thermal expansion become factors. If there is too much clearance, the valve may not seat properly and excessive oil consumption can occur.

Oil seal
As a valve guide wears, its ability to positively locate the valve to the valve seat decreases. As the valve loses its ability to seal the combustion chamber properly, the engine can lose performance and start to burn oil, leaking from the top of the cylinder head into the intake and exhaust manifolds.  Valve stems on modern engines are fitted with  oil seals which can be replaced if oil leakage occurs.

Wear
Over time, the inner diameter of the valve guide and the outer diameter of the valve stem may become worn.

Reaming
In the 1980s, many U.S. production engine remanufacturers began reaming valve guides, rather than replacing them, as part of their remanufacturing process. They found that by reaming all the valve guides in a head to one standard size (typically 0.008 in. diametrically oversized), and installing remanufactured engine valves having stems that are also oversized, a typical engine head can be remanufactured in much less time. Since the reaming process leaves the valve guide with a much better surface finish and shape than typical replacement guides, and since the oversize valves often have chrome plated stems, remanufacturers also discovered that valve train warranty issues are virtually eliminated.

Studies have been conducted which show that through the proper selection of the reamer and reaming process, valve guides can be quickly and efficiently reamed to a consistently repeatable size.

Replacement
Valve guides are typically shaped in a tube with a flare at one end.  Their replacement involves removing the worn part by driving it out with a hammer and specifically-shaped punch. Installation may involve heating the cylinder head and cooling the valve guide so as to ease insertion, then driving the new guide in quickly with a hammer. Once the parts return to room temperature the new valve guide will be solidly in place and ready to be reamed and honed to proper diameter.

References

Automobile engines
Mechanisms (engineering)
Engine valves